Benjamin Pye LL.D. (1726 – 1808) was Archdeacon of Durham from 1791 to 1808.

Pye was educated at New College, Oxford. He was Rector of Whitburn from 1769 to 1791.
He married (and was the second husband of) Elizabeth Bathurst-Sleigh 3rd daughter of Mary, who in turn was the second child of Charles Bathurst, MP for Richmond 1727.
 
According to (Sir) Cuthbert Sharp in his The Bishoprick Garland Benjamin Pye wrote the second "Stockton's Commendation".

He died on 26 March 1808.

See also 
Geordie dialect words
Cuthbert Sharp
The Bishoprick Garland 1834 by Sharp
List of Archdeacons of Durham

References

Archdeacons of Durham
English male poets
English songwriters
People from the City of Sunderland
Geordie songwriters
1808 deaths
Year of birth missing
Place of birth missing
Place of birth unknown
Alumni of New College, Oxford